Vanessa Rubin (born March 14, 1957) is an American jazz vocalist.

Biography
Born in Cleveland, Ohio, to parents from Trinidad and Louisiana, Rubin grew up in a musical household. She received a Bachelor of Arts degree in journalism from Ohio State University. A standing ovation while she performed "God Bless the Child" at the Miss Black Central Ohio Contest convinced her to pursue a career as a singer.

Rubin returned to Cleveland, where she began singing in clubs and hotels. She formed a band of organ, guitar, vibes and drums. After moving to New York City in 1982, she performed at Sweet Basil and at the Village Vanguard with the Pharoah Sanders Quartet. She then began to study with pianist Barry Harris at his Jazz Cultural Theatre.

She has worked with Kenny Barron, Lionel Hampton, the Mercer Ellington Orchestra, Cecil Bridgewater, Etta Jones, Toots Thielemans, Steve Turre, Cedar Walton, and Grover Washington, Jr. More recently she has completed international tours with Herbie Hancock, the Woody Herman Orchestra, and the Jazz Crusaders.

Rubin has been described as "an impressive song stylist with a Midas touch for challenging material", and her 2019 tribute to Tadd Dameron, The Dream Is You: Vanessa Rubin Sings Tadd Dameron, was nominated for the 51st NAACP Image Award for Outstanding Jazz Album.

Discography

References

1957 births
Living people
Jazz musicians from Ohio
Musicians from Cleveland
Ohio State University School of Communication alumni
American women jazz singers
American jazz singers
21st-century African-American women singers
20th-century African-American women singers